The  is a two-lane national expressway in Aomori Prefecture, Japan. The expressway connects the prefecture's capital, Aomori, and the Tōhoku Expressway to the municipalities of Goshogawara, Tsugaru and, Ajigasawa. It is owned and operated by Ministry of Land, Infrastructure, Transport and Tourism and is signed as an auxiliary route of National Route 101 as well as E64 under their "2016 Proposal for Realization of Expressway Numbering."

Route description

The expressway's eastern terminus lies near the Namioka Interchange of the Tōhoku Expressway. A signaled intersection along National Route 7 separates the entrance to the Tōhoku Expressway from the Tsugaru Expressway. From this intersection, the expressway follows a northwestern heading out of the city limits of Aomori into Goshogawara. The expressway serves as a high-speed alternate to the main National Route 101 from National Route 7 to Goshogawara. When the expressway meets National Route 101, it instead serves as a bypass to the city, curving around heading north, west, and then south to meet its western terminus at another junction with National Route 101.

The speed limit is 70 km/h for the entire route; however, during the winter the speed limit is reduced to 60 km/h.

Ajigasawa section
About  further west along National Route 101 in Ajigasawa, a  section of the expressway was partially completed in 2016 and expanded in 2019. Its eastern end lies just outside of Ajigasawa in Tsugaru at an intersection with Route 101. The expressway segment has a single junction with Aomori Prefecture Route 31 and a crossing over the Narusawa River before it meets its end at Route 101 once more.

History
On 8 August 1989, planning began on the route from the Namioka bypass to Goshogawawra. Construction began on the expressway in 1994. The first section of the expressway opened to traffic between Goshogawara-higashi and the Namioka bypass in 2002. Another section of the expressway opened to traffic between Goshogawara-higashi and Goshogawara-kita on 14 December 2007. The third section of the expressway opened to traffic between Goshogawara-kita and Tsugaru Kashiwa on 3 November 2014. On 17 March 2015 the maximum speed was increased to 70 km/h. On 30 July 2016 the Ajigasawa section opened to traffic with a temporary at-grade junction with Melon Road. This junction was replaced with a bridge on 26 March 2019 and the section was extended east to end at a junction with National Route 101.

Future

The expressway is being widened within the city of Aomori from two lanes to four.

The route would parallel Route 101 from the north until just before the route would meet the Ajigasawa section where it would cross the road, paralleling it from the south. This expressway is planned to be extended south through Fukaura, Aomori to Happō in Akita Prefecture.

Junction list

See also

Japan National Route 101

References

External links

 Ministry of Land, Infrastructure and Transport: Tohoku Regional Development Bureau

Roads in Aomori Prefecture
Expressways in Japan
2002 establishments in Japan